In computing, configuration files (commonly known simply as config files) are files used to configure the parameters and initial settings for some computer programs. They are used for user applications, server processes and operating system settings.

Some applications provide tools to create, modify, and verify the syntax of their configuration files; these sometimes have graphical interfaces.  For other programs, system administrators may be expected to create and modify files by hand using a text editor, which is possible because many are human-editable plain text files. For server processes and operating-system settings, there is often no standard tool, but operating systems may provide their own graphical interfaces such as YaST or debconf.

Some computer programs only read their configuration files at startup. Others periodically check the configuration files for changes. Users can instruct some programs to re-read the configuration files and apply the changes to the current process, or indeed to read arbitrary files as a configuration file. There are no definitive standards or strong conventions.

Configuration files and operating systems

Unix and Unix-like operating systems
Across Unix-like operating systems many different configuration-file formats exist, with each application or service potentially having a unique format, but there is a strong tradition of them being in human-editable plain text, and a simple key–value pair format is common. Filename extensions of .cnf, .conf, .cfg, .cf or .ini are often used.

Almost all formats allow comments, in which case, individual settings can be disabled by prepending with the comment character. Often the default configuration files contain extensive internal documentation in the form of comments and man files are also typically used to document the format and options available.

System-wide software often uses configuration files stored in /etc, while user applications often use a "dotfile" – a file or directory in the home directory prefixed with a period, which in Unix hides the file or directory from casual listing.

Some configuration files run a set of commands upon startup. A common convention is for such files to have "rc" in their name, typically using the name of the program then an "(.)rc" suffix e.g. ".xinitrc", ".vimrc", ".bashrc", "xsane.rc". See run commands for further details.

By contrast, IBM's AIX uses an Object Data Manager (ODM) database to store much of its system settings.

MS-DOS
MS-DOS itself primarily relied on just one configuration file, CONFIG.SYS. This was a plain text file with simple key–value pairs (e.g. DEVICEHIGH=C:\DOS\ANSI.SYS) until MS-DOS 6, which introduced an INI-file style format. There was also a standard plain text batch file named AUTOEXEC.BAT that ran a series of commands on boot. Both these files were retained up to Windows 98SE, which still ran on top of MS-DOS.

An example CONFIG.SYS for MS-DOS 5:
DOS=HIGH,UMB
DEVICE=C:\DOS\HIMEM.SYS
DEVICE=C:\DOS\EMM386.EXE RAM
DEVICEHIGH=C:\DOS\ANSI.SYS
FILES=30
SHELL=C:\DOS\COMMAND.COM C:\DOS /E:512 /P

DOS applications used a wide variety of individual configuration files, most of them binary, proprietary and undocumented - and there were no common conventions or formats.

Microsoft Windows

The early Microsoft Windows family of operating systems heavily utilized plain-text INI files (from "initialization"). These served as the primary mechanism to configure the operating system and application features. The APIs to read and write from these still exist in Windows, but after 1993, Microsoft began to steer developers away from using INI files and toward storing settings in the Windows Registry, a hierarchical database to store configuration settings, which was introduced that year with Windows NT.

macOS
The Property List is the standard configuration file format in macOS (as well as in iOS, NeXTSTEP, GNUstep and Cocoa applications). It uses the filename extension .plist.

IBM OS/2
IBM's OS/2 uses a binary format, also with a .INI suffix, but this differs from the Windows versions. It contains a list of lists of untyped key–value pairs.
Two files control system-wide settings: OS2.INI and OS2SYS.INI. Application developers can choose whether to use them or to create a specific file for their applications.

Serialization formats
A number of general-purpose serialization formats exist that can represent complex data structures in an easily stored format, and these are often used as a basis for configuration files, particularly in open-source and platform-neutral software applications and libraries. The specifications describing these formats are routinely made available to the public, thus increasing the availability of parsers and emitters across programming languages.
 
Examples include: JSON, XML, and YAML.

Comparison

See also
 .properties, a file extension mainly used in Java
 HOCON, a superset of .properties and JSON
 INI file, a common configuration file format
 JSON, with support for complex data types and data structures
 Run commands, which explains the historical origin of the "rc" suffix
 TOML, a formally-specified configuration file format
 YAML, with support for complex data types and structures

References